Ribosomal particles are denoted according to their sedimentation coefficients in Svedberg units. The 60S subunit is the large subunit of eukaryotic 80S ribosomes. It is structurally and functionally related to the 50S subunit of 70S prokaryotic ribosomes. However, the 60S subunit is much larger than the prokaryotic 50S subunit and contains many additional protein segments, as well as ribosomal RNA expansion segments.

Overall structure
Characteristic features of the large subunit, shown below in the "Crown View", include the central protuberance (CP) and the two stalks, which are named according to their bacterial protein components (L1 stalk on the left as seen from the subunit interface and L7/L12 on the right). There are three binding sites for tRNA, the A-site, P-site and E-site (see article on protein translation for details).
The core of the 60S subunit is formed by the 28S ribosomal RNA (abbreviated 28S rRNA), which is homologous to the prokaryotic 23S rRNA, which also contributes the active site (peptidyl transferase center, PTC) of the ribosome. The rRNA core is decorated with dozens of proteins. In the figure "Crystal Structure of the Eukaryotic 60S Ribosomal Subunit from T. thermophila", the ribosomal RNA core is represented as a grey tube and expansion segments are shown in red. Proteins which have homologs in eukaryotes, archaea and bacteria are shown as blue ribbons. Proteins shared only between eukaryotes and archaea are shown as orange ribbons and proteins specific to eukaryotes are shown as red ribbons.

60S ribosomal proteins
The table "60S ribosomal proteins" shows the individual protein folds of the 60S subunit colored by conservation as above. The eukaryote-specific extensions, ranging from a few residues or loops to very long alpha helices and additional domains, are highlighted in red.

Historically, different nomenclatures have been used for ribosomal proteins. For instance, proteins have been numbered according to their migration properties in gel electrophoresis experiments. Therefore, different names may refer to homologous proteins from different organisms, while identical names do not necessarily denote homologous proteins. The table "60S ribosomal proteins" cross-references the human ribosomal protein names with yeast, bacterial, and archaeal homologs. Further information can be found in the ribosomal protein gene database (RPG).

See also
 Eukaryotic small ribosomal subunit (40S)

References

External links 
 Ribosomal Protein Gene Database (RPG)

Ribosomal RNA